Hans Zürn the Elder (born between 1555 and 1560, died after 1631) was a German sculptor and father of the famous Upper Swabian Zürn family of sculptors.

Career 

He received his training as a sculptor around 1560 in Bad Buchau. He may have been a student of Jakob Grangler. From 1582 he was a citizen and master sculptor in Bad Waldsee. Hans Zürn the Elder was a teacher of his six sons, including David, Hans the Younger, Martin, and Michael the Elder.

References

External links 
 

16th-century German sculptors
German male sculptors
17th-century German sculptors
16th-century births
17th-century deaths
Year of birth unknown
Year of death unknown